What a Life may refer to:

Books
What a Life! (novel), a 1911 novel by E. V. Lucas and George Morrow

Film and entertainment
What a Life (short film), a 1930 short film directed by John G. Adolfi
What a Life (play), a 1938 play by Clifford Goldsmith that originally starred Ezra Stone
What a Life (film), a 1939 film based on Goldsmith's play, co-written by Billy Wilder

Music

Albums
What a Life! (album), a 1985 album by Divinyls
What a Life, 2013 album by Erin Boheme
What a Life (Gloria Gaynor album), European release of album The Answer, 1997
What a Life (Adam Brand album), a 2006 album by Adam Brand
What a Life (EP), a 2019 EP by Exo-SC

Songs
"What a Life" (Juliana Hatfield song), 1995
"What a Life" (Exo-SC song), 2019
 "What a Life", (Scarlet Pleasure song), 2019. Featured in the film Another Round (2020).

See also
Oh, What a Life (disambiguation)
"AKA... What a Life!", a 2011 song by Noel Gallagher's High Flying Birds